The Alternative for Social Advance (Alternativa de  Avanzada Social) is a political party in Colombia. 
At the last legislative elections, 10 March 2002, the party, as one of the many small parties, won parliamentary representation. 

Political parties in Colombia